A gun is an object that propels a projectile through a hollow tube, primarily as weaponry.

Gun(s) may also refer to:

Implements
 Cannon
 Artillery
 Deluge gun
 Water gun
 Light gun, a pistol-shaped gaming controller
 Gun (staff), a weapon used in Chinese martial arts

Places 
 Gun, a former administrative District of Japan
 Gun, a Korean county
 Gunnersbury station, London, England, National Rail station code
 Kőszeg or Güns, a town in Hungary

People
 Gun (Korean name), a masculine given name in Korean
 Gun (Swedish name), a feminine given name in Swedish
 Gün, a Turkish name
 Katharine Gun (born 1974), a former GCHQ employee and whistleblower
 Lance Gun (1903–1958), Australian cricketer
 Tracii Guns (born 1966), lead guitarist
 Alice Gun, English musician
 Gun (Chinese mythology) (鯀), mythological man and appointed flood control engineer, the father of Yu the Great, or, in other accounts, a legendary giant fish
 Gun, an alternative name in the United Kingdom for a shooter, particularly in the hunting of game birds

Groups, companies, organizations
 Gun Media, an American video game developer based in Lexington, Kentucky
 Gun (St. Paul's Churchyard), a historical bookseller in London

Art, entertainment, and media

Films
 Gun (2010 film), an American film
 Gun (2011 film), an Indian film
 Guns (film), a 1990 American film
 The Gun (1974 film), a television film directed by John Badham

Gaming
 Gun (cellular automaton), a pattern in Conway's Game of Life
 Gun (video game), a video game set in the 1880s in the American West
 Guardian Units of Nations (G.U.N), an organization in the Sonic The Hedgehog series of video games

Literature
 "Guns" (essay), a non-fiction essay by Stephen King
 The Gun (Chivers book), a 2010 non-fiction book by C. J. Chivers
 The Gun (novel), a 1933 novel by C. S. Forester
 "The Gun" (short story), a short story by Philip K. Dick

Music

Groups and labels
 Gun (band), a Scottish hard rock band 1987–1997, 2008 onwards
 GUN Records, a record label
 Gun (1960s band), an English hard rock band, late 1960s
 Gun (rapper), a South Korean rapper

Albums and EPs
 Guns (EP), a 1992 EP by Negativland
 Guns (Cardiacs album), 1999
 Guns (Quelle Chris album), 2019

Songs
 "Gun" (Chvrches song), 2013
 "Gun" (Gigolo Aunts song), a 1993 single by Gigolo Aunts from the album "Flippin' Out"
 "Gun" (Serebro song), a 2012 single by Serebro from the album Mama Lover
 "Gun," a song from the Soundgarden album Louder Than Love
 "Gun", a song by John Cale from the album Fear
 "Gun", a song by War from the album The Black-Man's Burdon
 "Gun.", a song by My Chemical Romance from the album Number Two, part of the compilation album Conventional Weapons
 "Guns", a song by Quelle Chris from the eponymous album Guns
 “Guns”, a song by Coldplay from the album Everyday Life
 "The Gun", a song by Lou Reed from his album The Blue Mask

Television
 Gun (TV series), a short-lived anthology series produced by Robert Altman
 Guns (miniseries), a Canadian television miniseries that aired on CBC Television in 2008
 "The Gun" (The Professionals), a 1980 episode of the British TV series
 "The Gun", an alternate name for the unmade Seinfeld episode "The Bet"
 "The Gun", a 1975 episode of the TV series M*A*S*H
 "The Gun", a 1986 episode of the TV sitcom Gimme a Break!

Languages
 Gun language, a Gbe language spoken in Benin and Nigeria
 Mbyá Guaraní language (ISO-639 language code gun)

Other uses 
 Guns, slang in sports & bodybuilding, for human biceps muscles
 Clathrate gun hypothesis, a hypothesised geological event where rises in sea temperatures (and/or falls in sea level) can trigger the sudden release of methane from methane clathrate
 Gunslayer Legend, a multimedia franchise including manga, a video game, and animated series

See also 
 
 Gunn (disambiguation)
 Gunner (disambiguation)
 Gunning (disambiguation)
 Güns (disambiguation)
 Gunz (disambiguation) or Günz
 Pistol (disambiguation)